Laci Denise Peterson (born Rocha; May 4, 1975 — c. December 24, 2002) was an American woman who was the subject of a highly publicized murder case after she disappeared while eight months pregnant with her first child. She was reportedly last seen alive on December 24, 2002.

Her husband, Scott Peterson, was later convicted of first-degree murder for her death, and second-degree murder for the death of their unborn son Conner. Since his conviction, Peterson has been housed at San Quentin State Prison. His death sentence was overturned on August 24, 2020. He was re-sentenced to life in prison without the possibility of parole on December 8, 2021.

Early life and marriage
Laci Denise Rocha was born May 4, 1975, to Sharon and Dennis Robert Rocha, a dairy operator, who had met in high school, and owned a dairy farm west of Escalon, California. Sharon named Laci after a pretty girl she met in high school. Laci's older brother, Brent Rocha, was born in 1971. Laci worked on the farm from a young age, and also enjoyed gardening with her mother, an activity from which she developed an appreciation for plant life that influenced her later life. Sharon and Dennis divorced when Laci and her brother Brent were young. Sharon and the children moved to Modesto, though the children visited the dairy farm on weekends. Sharon eventually married Ron Grantski, who helped raise Laci and Brent from the time Laci was two years old.

Laci was a cheerleader in junior high and high school. After graduating from Thomas Downey High School, she attended California Polytechnic State University, where she majored in ornamental horticulture. While at California Polytechnic, Laci would sometimes visit a friend who worked at a restaurant in Morro Bay called the Pacific Café. There, she met her friend's coworker, Scott Peterson, in mid-1994. Laci made the first move, sending Scott her phone number, and immediately after meeting him, she told her mother that she had met the man that she would marry. Scott later called Laci and they began dating, their first date being a deep-sea fishing trip on which Laci got seasick. As Laci's relationship with Scott grew more serious, he put aside his dreams of professional golf in order to focus on a business path. The couple dated for two years, and eventually moved in together.

While Scott finished his senior year, Laci took a job in nearby Prunedale. Prosecutors have stated that around this time, Scott engaged in the first of at least two extramarital affairs, though they have not revealed a name or details of this first relationship. After her graduation, the couple married at Sycamore Mineral Springs Resort in San Luis Obispo County's Avila Valley on August 9, 1997. Peterson graduated with a Bachelor of Science degree in agricultural business in June 1998. After their graduations, the Petersons opened a sports bar in San Luis Obispo called The Shack. Business was initially slow, but eventually improved, especially on weekends. The Petersons decided to put The Shack up for sale when they moved to Laci's hometown of Modesto, California to start a family. In October 2000, they purchased a three-bedroom, two-bath bungalow house for $177,000 on Covena Avenue in an upscale neighborhood near East La Loma Park. They sold the Shack in April 2001.

Laci took a part-time job as a substitute teacher, and Scott got a job with Tradecorp U.S.A., a newly founded subsidiary of a European fertilizer company, in which Scott earned a salary of $5,000 a month before taxes. Laci's family, including her mother and younger sister, related that she worked enthusiastically at being the perfect housewife, enjoying cooking and entertaining, and that she and her family welcomed the news in 2002 that she was pregnant. Laci's due date was February 10, 2003. The couple had planned to name their son Conner. In November 2002, when Laci was seven months pregnant, Scott was introduced by a friend to a Fresno massage therapist named Amber Frey. In later public statements, Frey said Scott told her he was single, and the two began a romantic relationship. The last time Scott's parents saw Laci was during a three-day weekend they spent together in Carmel, California the week before Christmas 2002.

Disappearance
On December 23, 2002, at 5:45 p.m., Laci and Scott went to Salon Salon, the workplace of Laci's sister Amy Rocha, where Amy cut Scott's hair as she did each month. As they spoke, Scott offered to pick up a fruit basket that Amy had ordered for her grandfather as a Christmas gift the next day because he would be playing golf at a course nearby. Prosecutors say Scott also told other people he would play golf on the day of Christmas Eve. Her mother Sharon spoke with Laci on the telephone around 8:30 that evening. Apart from her husband Scott, the last two people known to have spoken to Laci before she disappeared were her half-sister, Amy, and her mother, Sharon.

Scott later told police that he last saw his wife about 9:30am on December 24, when he left to go fishing at the Berkeley Marina. He said Laci was watching a cooking television show, preparing to mop the floor, bake cookies, and walk the family dog to a nearby park. At the time of her disappearance, Laci was 7 1/2  months pregnant. Later that morning Karen Servas, a neighbor of the Petersons, stated that around 10:30am she found the Petersons' dog, a golden retriever named McKenzie, alone outside the home and returned him to the Petersons' back yard. Another neighbor named Mike Chiavetta said he saw McKenzie at about 10:45am as he played catch with his own dog. The Modesto Bee also reported an unnamed female neighbor who found the dog with muddy leash, wandering in the neighborhood. That neighbor put the dog in the Petersons' yard, not observing that anything was out of place. Scott said he returned home that afternoon to find the house empty. Peterson said Laci's 1996 Land Rover Discovery SE was in the driveway. Peterson also stated that he found McKenzie in their back yard, and that he related this to Laci's mother, Sharon, though she later denied this in her book. He showered and washed his clothes because he got wet during his fishing trip "from the bay and being rained on", as Brocchini later testified. He then ate some pizza with milk.

Reported missing and initial investigation 
According to ABC News, Laci's mother Sharon Rocha, stated that Scott called her to ask if Laci was with her, which was the first time Sharon learned that Laci was missing. Later that evening Ron Grantski called the police to report Laci missing. After police arrived at the Peterson home, Laci's keys, wallet and sunglasses were found in her purse in a closet at the home that evening. 

Modesto police detectives Jon Buehler and Allen Brocchini, the lead investigators on the case, questioned Scott Peterson that evening. Buehler told ABC News in 2017, "I suspected Scott when I first met him. Didn't mean he did it, but I was a little bit thrown off by his calm, cool demeanor and his lack of questioning ... he wasn't, 'Will you call me back? Can I have one of your cards? What are you guys doing now?'" Buehler further described Scott's behavior as "a strange combination of polite and arrogant, disaffectedly distant and impatiently irritable. He just didn't seem like a man who was crushed or even greatly disturbed by his wife's disappearance and possible death." Although Scott initially said he had spent the day golfing, he later told the police that he had gone to fish for sturgeon at the Berkeley Marina. At 2:15 p.m., he left a message for Laci, stating, "Hey, Beautiful. It's 2:15. I'm leaving Berkeley." Scott stated that he went fishing about 90 miles from the couple's Modesto home. Detectives immediately launched a search. Sharon Rocha immediately hurried to the park to search for her daughter. She stated that when she saw Scott about 20-30 feet away she repeatedly called him by name, but he did not acknowledge her, and was distant when she approached him back at his house, angling away from her when she attempted to hug him.

Search
Modesto police and firefighters carried out an extensive search along Dry Creek the day after Laci's disappearance. The search came to include helicopters equipped with searchlights, police mounted on horseback and bicycles, canine units, and water-rescue units on rafts. A total of 30 officers were involved in the search, as well as Laci's loved ones and volunteers, who posted fliers to raise awareness of her disappearance. At a press conference, detective Al Brocchini said that police did not believe that Laci decided to leave without contacting her family, commenting, "That is completely out of character for her." The initial search and later vigil were organized by the immediate family and friends. In the first two days, up to 900 people were involved in looking for Laci, before community officials or police directly participated in the search, and prior to significant media coverage. Eventually, the story attracted nationwide media interest.

A $25,000 reward was offered, later increased to $250,000, and finally to $500,000 for any information leading to Laci's safe return. Posters, blue and yellow ribbons, and fliers were circulated, and the original, basic version of the LaciPeterson.com website was launched by the husband of one of her friends. Friends, family, and volunteers set up a command center at a nearby Red Lion Hotel to record developments and circulate information. Over 1,500 volunteers signed up to distribute information and to help search for her.

Discovery of bodies
On April 13, 2003, a couple walking their dog found the decomposing, but well-preserved body of a late-term male fetus in a marshy area of the San Francisco Bay shore in Richmond's Point Isabel Regional Shoreline park, north of Berkeley. Its umbilical cord was still attached, appearing to have been torn, not cut or clamped, as is the normal practice after birth. Although a judge sealed the autopsy results, an anonymous Associated Press source revealed that 1.5 loops of nylon tape were found around the fetus' neck and a significant cut was on the fetus' body.

One day later, a passerby found the body of a recently pregnant woman, wearing beige pants and a maternity bra, washed up on the eastern rocky shoreline of the bay, one mile away from where the baby's body was found. The corpse was decomposed to the point of being almost unrecognizable as a human body. The woman had been decapitated and her limbs were missing, including most of her legs. On April 18, 2003, the results of DNA tests verified that they were the bodies of Laci and her unborn son, who was to be named Conner.

Autopsies
The autopsies on both bodies were performed by forensic pathologist Dr. Brian Peterson (no relation). Conner's skin was not decomposed at all, though the right side of his body was mutilated. An April 24 ABC News report stated his umbilical cord was still attached, and the San Francisco Chronicle reported that it appeared torn, rather than cut or clamped, as is the normal practice following birth. However, ABC News later reported on May 30 that according to the autopsy, the placenta and umbilical cord were not found with the body.

The exact date and cause of Laci's death were never determined. Her cervix was intact. She had suffered two cracked ribs, but Dr. Peterson could not determine if this occurred before or after her death. Laci's upper torso had been emptied of internal organs except for the uterus, which protected the fetus, explaining the lower level of decomposition it experienced. Dr. Peterson concluded that the fetus had died in utero, and determined he had been expelled from Laci's decaying body, though when cross-examined in court, he conceded that he could not determine whether he had been born alive when this occurred. Dr. Peterson also found meconium in the fetus's bowels, which is the first stool passed after birth.

Investigation and trial
On January 17, 2003, it became known that Peterson had engaged in two other extramarital affairs prior to an affair with a woman named Amber Frey. Frey informed police of their relationship on December 30, 2002, shortly after discovering he was a person of interest in Peterson's disappearance, She told detectives that she met Peterson on November 20, and that he had initially told her he was single. After they had begun dating, however, she came to suspect that he was married, and confronted him on December 9 about this. Frey said to Brocchini, "He said he lost his wife, this would be the first holiday he was without his wife." She informed police that Scott had told her on December 9, two weeks before Peterson's disappearance, he was a widower, and it would be the first Christmas without his wife. Police considered whether this was an indication that Peterson had already decided to kill Laci, which Sharon Rocha agreed was a possibility.

Scott was arrested on April 18, 2003, near a La Jolla golf course. He claimed to be meeting his father and brother for a game of golf. His naturally dark brown hair had been dyed blond, and his Mercedes was "overstuffed" with miscellaneous items, including nearly $15,000 in cash, 12 Viagra tablets, survival gear, camping equipment, several changes of clothes, four cell phones, and two driver's licenses, his and his brother's. Scott's father, Lee Peterson, explained that Scott had used his brother's license the day before to get a San Diego resident discount at the golf course, and that Scott had been living out of his car because of the media attention. Police and prosecutors, however, saw these items as an indication that Peterson had planned to flee to Mexico.

On April 21, 2003, Scott was arraigned in Stanislaus County Superior Court before Judge Nancy Ashley. He was charged with two felony counts of murder with premeditation and special circumstances. He pleaded not guilty. Judge Al Girolami of Stanislaus County Superior Court moved his trial to San Mateo County because so many people in Stanislaus had made up their minds about Peterson's guilt. His trial began on June 1, 2004. On November 12, 2004, Scott Peterson was convicted of first degree murder for his wife's death and second degree murder for Conner's death. Judge Alfred A. Delucchi sentenced Scott to death, calling the murder of Laci "cruel, uncaring, heartless, and callous".

In March 2019, California Governor Gavin Newsom issued a moratorium for all 737 prisoners on death row in California, including Peterson. The order postponed all executions for the duration of Newsom's tenure as governor. California had not executed a prisoner since 2006 due to legal challenges to the state's execution protocol. Newsom's order spared the approximately 25 prisoners on death row who had exhausted their legal appeals and could have had their executions move forward once the legal challenge was resolved. Peterson's sister-in-law Janey Peterson welcomed Newsom's decision but noted that his case was likely to be unaffected by it, and did not believe Peterson would exhaust all of his legal challenges by January 2027, when Newsom will be leaving office, following his re-election in 2022.

Aftermath
Laci and Conner were buried at Burwood Cemetery on August 30, 2003. The death of Laci and Conner Peterson led to the passage of the Unborn Victims of Violence Act, which is also known as Laci and Conner's Law. On April 1, 2004, Sharon Rocha and her husband Ron Grantski were in attendance at the White House when President George W. Bush signed the bill into law. The Act provides that, under federal law, any person who causes death or injury to an unborn child while in the commission of a crime upon a pregnant woman will be charged with a separate offense.

On October 21, 2005, Stanislaus County, California, Superior Court Judge Roger Beauchesne ruled that Scott was not entitled to collect on Laci's $250,000 life insurance policy, having been convicted of her murder. Under California state law, criminals may not profit from insurance policies. On December 19, 2005, the money was given to her mother, Sharon Rocha, as the executor of her estate. The California Fifth District Court of Appeals in Fresno later affirmed the trial court's decision on October 31, 2007.

In 2006, Sharon wrote For Laci: A Mother's Story of Love, Loss, and Justice, a biography and memoir about Laci's life and death. All proceeds are used to fund the Laci and Conner Search and Rescue Fund, which she had founded. On January 29, 2006, it was listed at No. 1 on The New York Times Non-Fiction Best Seller list.

Laci's stepfather, Ron Grantski, died in his sleep at his Modesto home on April 8, 2018, at age 71, after a lengthy period of failing health. He was buried next to Laci and Conner. Laci's father, Dennis Rocha, died December 9, 2018, at the age of 72.

On August 24, 2020, in a 7-0 decision, the Supreme Court of California upheld Peterson's conviction, but overturned his death sentence, because Peterson's trial judge, Alfred Delucchi, who had died on February 26, 2008, had dismissed jurors who opposed capital punishment without asking them whether they could put their views aside. Justice Leondra Kruger explained that per U.S. Supreme Court rulings since 1968, "Jurors may not be excused merely for opposition to the death penalty, but only for views rendering them unable to fairly consider imposing that penalty in accordance with their oath. This is the meaning of the guarantee of an impartial jury." Prosecutors initially stated that they would retry the penalty phase, but reversed that decision in June 2021.

On September 22, 2021, California Superior Court Judge Anne-Christine Massullo scheduled Peterson to be re-sentenced that November to life in prison without the possibility of parole. On December 8, Massullo re-sentenced Peterson to life in prison without the possibility of parole for the first-degree murder of Laci, and a concurrent sentence of 15 years to life for the second-degree murder of Conner.

Depiction in media

 In 2004, USA Network aired the television film The Perfect Husband: The Laci Peterson Story.
 In 2004, E! aired an episode of The E! True Hollywood Story on Laci Peterson.
 In 2005, the case was covered in the TV movie, Amber Frey: Witness for the Prosecution.
 In 2010, the Peterson case was the topic of the eponymous premiere episode of Investigation Discovery's True Crime with Aphrodite Jones.
 Although the case had been compared to the plot of Gillian Flynn's 2012 novel Gone Girl, Flynn refuted the notion her book was inspired by the Petersons, saying that although she saw parallels between the two, she made a point not to rely on any specific true account for her fiction. Rather, her portrayal of her characters as out-of-work writers was derived from her own experience being laid off from her job as a writer for Entertainment Weekly.
 In 2015, the series Murder Made Me Famous covered the story in its second episode, which premiered August 22. It re-aired in 2017 on the American cable channel Reelz as Scott Peterson: What Happened?
 In April 2017, Crime Junkie Podcast produced two episodes detailing Peterson's murder.
 On April 21, 2017, the NBC news magazine Dateline aired the two-hour special, The Laci Peterson Story: A Dateline Investigation.
In May 2017, the Peterson case was the main focus of "Notorious: Scott Peterson", the Season 20 premiere of the Oxygen TV series Snapped.
 In June 2017, ABC aired a two-hour documentary on the case titled Truth and Lies: The Murder of Laci Peterson.
 In July 2017, HLN aired a two-hour program on the case titled How It Really Happened.
 In August 2017, the case was covered in A&E's six part series, The Murder of Laci Peterson.
 In November 2017, Investigation Discovery aired a two-hour documentary titled Scott Peterson: An American Murder Mystery.
 In December 2018, the case was discussed on the talk show Dr. Phil.
 In May 2021, the case was covered in the 48 Hours episode "Scott Peterson: Case in Question".
 In May 2021, the case was covered in the 20/20 episode "One Last Chance".

See also 
List of solved missing person cases

References

External links 
 "Links to past coverage of the murder of Laci Peterson". The Modesto Bee.
 "Phone transcript: Peterson tells mistress of missing wife". Court TV. January 6, 2003.

2000s missing person cases
2002 in California
2002 murders in the United States
Capital murder cases
Crime in California
Deaths by person in California
December 2002 events in the United States
Familicides
Female murder victims
Formerly missing people
Incidents of violence against women
Missing person cases in California
Murder in the San Francisco Bay Area
Violence against women in the United States
History of women in California